Daniel M. Lavery (born Mallory Ortberg, November 28, 1986) is an American author and editor. He is known for having co-founded the website The Toast, and written the books Texts from Jane Eyre (2014), The Merry Spinster (2018), and Something That May Shock and Discredit You (2020). He wrote Slate's "Dear Prudence" advice column from 2016 to 2021. As of 2022, he hosts a podcast on Slate titled Big Mood, Little Mood. In 2017, he started a paid e-mail newsletter on Substack titled Shatner Chatner, renamed to The Chatner in 2021.

Early life 
Born Mallory Ortberg, Lavery grew up in northern Illinois and then San Francisco, one of three children of the evangelical Christian author and former Menlo Church pastor John Ortberg and Nancy Ortberg, who is also a pastor and the CEO of Transforming the Bay with Christ. He attended Azusa Pacific University, a private, evangelical Christian university in California. While a student, Lavery appeared on Jeopardy!, Show #5816 of Monday, December 21, 2009, and finished in third place.

Writing

Influences 
Lavery has credited the work of Shirley Jackson and her novel We Have Always Lived in the Castle, in particular, and John Bunyan's The Pilgrim's Progress as influential.

Career overview
Lavery wrote for Gawker and The Hairpin. Through this work he met Nicole Cliffe, with whom he operated The Toast, a feminist general interest web site, from July 2013 to July 2016.

He was included in the 2015 Forbes "30 under 30" list in the media category. On November 9, 2015, Slate announced he would take over the magazine's "Dear Prudence" advice column from Emily Yoffe. He stopped writing the column in May 2021.

In 2017, he launched Shatner Chatner, a paid e-mail newsletter on Substack. On May 19, 2021, Lavery accepted a Substack Pro deal and shortened the newsletter's name to The Chatner.

Books

Texts from Jane Eyre 
Lavery's first book, Texts from Jane Eyre, was released in November 2014 and became a New York Times bestseller. The book was based on a column he wrote first at The Hairpin, then continued at The Toast, which imagines well-known literary characters exchanging text messages. The premise was inspired by a comments section thread on a piece Cliffe had written for The Awl; on Cliffe's review of Gone With the Wind, a commenter wrote that their experience in the South was nearly identical to the novel "except everybody has cellphones". This prompted him to imagine how Scarlett O'Hara might have used a cell phone.

Rick and Morty Presents: Krombopulos Michael 
Lavery's first comic one-shot, entitled Rick and Morty Presents: Krombopulos Michael, was published by Oni Press on June 20, 2018, following the Rick and Morty character of the same name.

The Merry Spinster 
A short story collection, The Merry Spinster: Tales of Everyday Horror (Henry Holt, 2018), appeared in 2018. The book, his second release, was highly anticipated, with Publishers Weekly, Bustle, The A.V. Club and InStyle Australia included in their lists of forthcoming titles in 2018. The Merry Spinster reinvents fairy tales such as Cinderella and Beauty and the Beast; in the Los Angeles Times, Agatha French described his renderings as making the "stories both weirder and yet somehow more familiar".

Something That May Shock and Discredit You

Lavery's third book, a memoir entitled Something That May Shock and Discredit You, was published in February 2020 by Simon & Schuster. It was originally published as individual essays.

Personal life

Lavery identifies as queer. In February 2018, he spoke to Autostraddle about the process of gender transitioning while writing The Merry Spinster. In March 2018, he was interviewed by Heather Havrilesky in New York magazine's The Cut about coming out as trans.

In November 2018, he and partner Grace Lavery, an associate professor of English at UC Berkeley and "the most followed transgender scholar in the world on social media" including Twitter and Instagram, announced their intention to marry. They were married on December 22, 2019.

References

External links

Contributions on The Toast
Texts from Jane Eyre

1986 births
American advice columnists
American bloggers
Transgender men
Living people
Place of birth missing (living people)
Slate (magazine) people
21st-century American non-fiction writers
LGBT people from Illinois
American satirists
Azusa Pacific University alumni
Writers from the San Francisco Bay Area
21st-century LGBT people
American transgender writers